Victor S. Yarros (1865–1956) was an American anarchist, lawyer and author. He immigrated to the United States with his friend Charles David Spivak in 1882. He was law partner to Clarence Darrow for eleven years in Chicago, husband to the feminist gynecologist Rachelle Yarros (née Slobodinsky) and resident of Hull-House Settlement. He was a prolific contributor to the individualist anarchist periodical in the United States called Liberty.

Yarros' political views evolved significantly over the years, from free-market anarchism to social democracy. He shifted from Spencerian anarchism, to individualist anarchism under Benjamin Tucker and finally to a follower of Lysander Spooner. According to Roderick T. Long, by the 1930s, Yarros came to believe that the democratic state was useful in the struggle against economic privilege.

See also 
 Anarchism in the United States
 Left-libertarianism

References

Further reading 
 Victor Yarros (1897). "Individualist or Philosophical Anarchism".
 Victor Yarros (1897). Anarchism: Its Aims and Methods.
 Victor Yarros (1888). "The Woman Question"
 Victor Yarros (1888). "Socialist Economics and the Labor Movement"
 Victor Yarros (1920). "Our revolution; essays in interpretation".
 Victor Yarros. "My 11 Years with Clarence Darrow".
 Works by Victor Yarros at the Fair Use Repository.
 Lysander Spooner (1912). Free Political Institutions: Their Nature, Essence, and Maintenance. An Abridgment and Rearrangement of Lysander Spooner's "Trial by Jury". Edited by Victor Yarros.

External links 
 Roderick T. Long (March 16, 2006). "How Victor Yarros Learned to Stop Worrying and Love the State". Retrieved March 25, 2019.
 https://theanarchistlibrary.org/category/author/victor-yarros

1865 births
1956 deaths
American political writers
American male non-fiction writers
Individualist anarchists
Egoist anarchists
American anarchists
Russian communists
American communists